Butthole Surfers/Live PCPPEP is the third compilation album by American punk band Butthole Surfers, released in January 2003.  All songs were written by Butthole Surfers.

This compilation contains the entirety of the band's first studio EP, Butthole Surfers, and its first live EP, Live PCPPEP, neither of which had previously been available in CD format. The live songs were recorded at The Meridian in San Antonio, Texas on March 25, 1984. Both releases were originally published by Alternative Tentacles. Vinyl records of Butthole Surfers are still available from that label, under the name Brown Reason to Live.

The album also contains four bonus tracks (15-18). Two of them, "Gary Floyd" and "Matchstick," are live songs from the Live PCPPEP concert.  The third bonus track, "Sinister Crayon," was previously only available on the double-LP version of the compilation Humpty Dumpty LSD.  "Something" is an early demo, which was also released on the compilation The Hole Truth... and Nothing Butt.

The CD's label features a reproduction of the "Pee Pee the Sailor" cartoon that had appeared on Alternative Tentacles' vinyl printings of Butthole Surfers. It also reprints that record's erroneous suggestion that listeners play the disc at "69 RPM," a joke referencing the famous sex position.

Track listing
All songs written by Butthole Surfers.

"The Shah Sleeps in Lee Harvey's Grave" – 2:09 1
"Hey" – 2:06 1
"Something" – 4:36 1
"Bar-B-Q Pope" – 3:36 1
"Wichita Cathedral" – 2:22 1
"Suicide" – 1:24 1
"The Revenge of Anus Presley" – 2:25 1
"Cowboy Bob" – 2:32 2
"Bar-B-Q Pope" – 3:09 2
"Dance of the Cobras" – 0:34 2
"The Shah Sleeps in Lee Harvey's Grave" – 2:26 2
"Wichita Cathedral" – 2:45 2
"Hey" – 2:17 2
"Something" – 7:38 2
"Gary Floyd" – 2:02 3
"Matchstick" – 3:09 3
"Sinister Crayon" – 4:01 4
"Something" – 5:03 5

1 From 1983's Butthole Surfers 
2 From 1984's Live PCPPEP, recorded live at San Antonio, Texas' The Meridian on March 25, 1984 
3 Previously unreleased recordings from the Meridian show 
4 Bonus track 
5 Demo

Personnel
 Gibby Haynes – lead vocals (Tracks 2, 5–8, 12–13, 15–17), saxophone
 Paul Leary – guitar, lead vocals (Tracks 1, 3–4, 9, 11, 14, 18)
 Bill Jolly – bass (Tracks 1–16, 18, 17?)
 King Coffey – drums (Tracks 4–5, 8–17)
 Scott Matthews – drums (Tracks 1–3, 6–7, 18)
 Teresa Nervosa – drums (Tracks 8–16, 17?)

Butthole Surfers albums
2003 live albums
2003 compilation albums